Monsters University is a 2013 American computer-animated monster comedy film produced by Walt Disney Pictures and Pixar Animation Studios and released by Walt Disney Studios Motion Pictures. It was directed by Dan Scanlon (in his feature directorial debut), produced by Kori Rae, and written by Scanlon and the writing team of Dan Gerson and Robert L. Baird. John Lasseter, Pete Docter, Andrew Stanton, and Lee Unkrich served as the film’s executive producers. The music for the film was composed and conducted by Randy Newman, making it his seventh collaboration with Pixar. It is a prequel to Monsters, Inc. (2001), making it the only time Pixar has made a prequel film. Monsters University tells the story of the main characters of Monsters, Inc., James P. Sullivan and Mike Wazowski, and their time at college, where they start off as bitter rivals, but slowly become best friends. During the time, they must learn to work together, along with Oozma Kappa members, in order to make their dreams reality and things right. John Goodman, Billy Crystal, Steve Buscemi, Bob Peterson, and John Ratzenberger reprise their roles as James P. Sullivan, Mike Wazowski, Randall Boggs, Roz, and the Abominable Snowman, respectively, while the new cast were joined by Helen Mirren, Alfred Molina, Peter Sohn, Joel Murray, Sean Hayes, Dave Foley, Charlie Day, and Nathan Fillion. Bonnie Hunt, who voiced Ms. Flint in the original film, voices Mike's teacher Mrs. Karen Graves.

Disney, as the rights holder, had plans for a sequel to Monsters, Inc. since 2005. Following disagreements with Pixar, Disney tasked its Circle 7 Animation unit to make the film. An early draft of the film was developed; however, Disney's purchase of Pixar in January 2006 led to the cancellation of Circle 7's version of the film. A Pixar-made sequel was confirmed in 2010, and in 2011, it was confirmed that the film would instead be a prequel titled Monsters University.

Monsters University premiered on June 5, 2013 at the BFI Southbank in London, England, and was theatrically released in the United States on June 21, 2013. It was accompanied in theaters by a short film, The Blue Umbrella, directed by Saschka Unseld. The film received positive reviews from critics and grossed $743 million worldwide against its $200 million production budget, making it the seventh highest-grossing film of 2013. An animated short film titled Party Central, which takes place shortly after the events of Monsters University, premiered in fall 2013 before being released theatrically with Muppets Most Wanted in 2014.

Plot 

From a young age, Mike Wazowski dreams of becoming a scarer, a monster who enters the human world to scare children and harvest their screams to power the city of Monstropolis. Mike enrolls in the scaring program at Monsters University (MU) and meets classmates Randall Boggs and James P. "Sulley" Sullivan. Abigail Hardscrabble, the dean of MU, warns students that anyone who does not pass the exam at the end of the first semester will leave the program.

As the semester progresses, Mike and Sulley form a rivalry: Mike studies hard to improve himself, while Sulley relies only on his natural talent and begins to falter. On the day of the exam, a fight between the duo inadvertently destroys Hardscrabble’s prized scream canister. Hardscrabble tests them separately and fails them both, Sulley for his rashness, and Mike for not being scary. 

Wishing to prove himself, Mike signs up for the "Scare Games" and makes a deal with Hardscrabble on the condition that if his team wins, all of the members will be admitted to the scaring program; otherwise, Mike will leave MU. Mike joins Oozma Kappa (OK), a fraternity of misfits, but they are one member short of being able to enter. Sulley offers to join OK, and Mike reluctantly accepts. 

OK finishes last in the first round, but are saved from elimination after another team is disqualified for cheating. During each of the next three rounds, OK steadily improves due to Mike's knowledge of scaring and the others' unique talents. Despite their progress, they face humiliation from rival fraternity Roar Omega Roar (ROR), and Hardscrabble questions Sulley whether he believes that Mike can be an effective scarer. Although OK has a decisive victory over ROR in the final round, Mike discovers afterwards that Sulley had tampered with the simulator settings to guarantee a win for OK, resulting in a heated argument between the two. The other OK members discard their trophy, disappointed that Sulley ruined their victory by cheating.

Outraged at Sulley's betrayal and still determined to prove that he can become a scarer, Mike breaks into the school's door lab and enters the human world. He emerges in a summer camp cabin full of children but is unable to scare any of them and flees into the woods. With assistance from the OK members, Sulley sneaks through the door and finds Mike; he admits to Mike that he cheated because he was afraid of failing his team. They reconcile and try to return to MU, but find out that Hardscrabble has deactivated the door.

As human police officers and rangers begin to chase Mike and Sulley, Mike realizes that they may be able to power the door from their side. Working together, Mike traps the police officers and Sulley scares them so badly that it manages to power through the door. The duo then return to MU just as it explodes. Mike and Sulley are expelled from MU for their actions, but the remaining OK members are admitted into the scaring program. As Mike and Sulley leave the campus, Hardscrabble admits that they have surprised her and expresses her hope that they will continue to do so in the future. Seeing a "Help Wanted" advertisement for job openings at Monsters, Inc., they decide to apply and are hired to work in the mailroom. Sulley and Mike work their way up to different jobs before becoming a scarer and scare assistant, respectively.

Voice cast

 Billy Crystal as Mike Wazowski, the main character.
 Noah Johnston as Young Mike
 John Goodman as James P. "Sulley" Sullivan
 Steve Buscemi as Randall “Randy” Boggs
 Peter Sohn as Scott "Squishy" Squibbles, an Oozma Kappa fraternity member.
 Joel Murray as Don Carlton, a middle-aged returning student and the founding member and president of Oozma Kappa fraternity.
 Sean P. Hayes and Dave Foley as Terri and Terry Perry, Oozma Kappa fraternity members who share each other's body
 Charlie Day as Art, an Oozma Kappa fraternity member.
 Helen Mirren as Dean Abigail Hardscrabble, the chair of the Scarer program at Monsters University.
 Alfred Molina as Professor Derek Knight, the "Scaring 101" professor for Hardscrabble's Scarer program.
 Tyler Labine as Brock Pearson, Greek Council president who commentates the Scare Games with Claire.
 Nathan Fillion as Johnny J. Worthington III, president of Roar Omega Roar fraternity.
 Aubrey Plaza as Claire Wheeler, Greek Council vice-president who commentates the Scare Games with Brock.
 Bobby Moynihan as Chet Alexander, a fraternity member and vice-president of Roar Omega Roar.
 Julia Sweeney as Sheri Squibbles, Scott's mother.
 Bonnie Hunt as Mrs. Karen Graves, Mike's teacher.
 John Krasinski as "Frightening" Frank McCay, a scarer who inspires a young Mike to follow him into the profession.
 Bill Hader as Referee / Slug
 Bob Peterson as Roz
 John Ratzenberger as The Yeti, a Monsters, Inc. mailroom employee.
 John Cygan as Big Red
 Jess Harnell as Fraternity Brother
 Lori Alan as a bus driver
 Mona Marshall as Emmet
 Dan Scanlon as Improv Club Monster
 Marcia Wallace as the Librarian
 Donovan Patton as Monsters, Inc. Cop #1
 Gregg Berger as Monsters, Inc. Cop #2
 Rodger Bumpass as Jerry Jablonski
 Colleen O'Shaughnessey as Fay Wei 

Kelsey Grammer was originally announced to voice Henry J. Waternoose III in the film, replacing James Coburn, who voiced Waternoose in the original film and passed away in 2002. The character was eventually cut from the film.

Production

Development
Plans for a second Monsters, Inc. film existed since 2002. Following disagreements between Disney CEO Michael Eisner and Pixar CEO Steve Jobs, Disney—which owned the rights to make sequels to all of Pixar's films up to and including Cars—announced that a sequel to Monsters, Inc. would be made by Disney's Circle 7 Animation studio, which was also working on early drafts of Toy Story 3 & Finding Nemo 2. Titled Monsters, Inc. 2: Lost in Scaradise, the film would have focused on Mike and Sulley visiting the human world to give Boo a birthday present, only to find that she had moved. After getting trapped in the human world, Mike and Sulley would split up after disagreeing on what to do. Screenwriters Rob Muir and Bob Hilgenberg were hired to write a script for the film, and storyboarded an early draft of it. Disney's change of management in late 2005—in which Eisner was replaced by Bob Iger—led to renewed negotiations with Pixar, and in January 2006 Disney announced it had purchased the studio. The Disney-owned sequel rights were then transferred to Pixar, leading to the cancellation of Muir and Hilgenberg's version of the film and the subsequent closure of Circle 7.

A Pixar-made sequel was confirmed in 2010. The film was originally planned for release on November 16, 2012, but the release was moved up to November 2, 2012 to avoid competition with The Twilight Saga: Breaking Dawn – Part 2. On March 29, 2011, it was confirmed that the film would be a prequel and the title Monsters University was announced. On April 4, 2011, due to Pixar's past success with summer releases, according to a Disney executive, it was confirmed that the film would be released on June 21, 2013.

The feature was directed by Dan Scanlon and produced by Kori Rae. Billy Crystal, John Goodman, Steve Buscemi, Bob Peterson, and John Ratzenberger reprised their roles, and Bonnie Hunt voiced a new character. New voice cast included Dave Foley, Sean Hayes, Julia Sweeney, Helen Mirren, Alfred Molina, Peter Sohn, Charlie Day, Joel Murray, Nathan Fillion, Aubrey Plaza, Tyler Labine, John Krasinski, Bill Hader, Bobby Moynihan, and Beth Behrs.

The plot of Monsters University details Mike and Sulley's first meeting, contradicting a scene from the original film in which Mike tells Sulley "You've been jealous of my good looks since the fourth grade." Director Dan Scanlon said he had a dilemma with this line during pre-production, but he believed it was best if Mike and Sulley meet in college because, "we wanted to see their relationship develop when they were adults. And we also felt like college is so much about self-discovery and figuring out who you are." He added, "It felt like the perfect place to do this, but we had that line. So we tried versions where they met young and then we skipped ahead to college. And we knew we didn't want to make Monsters Elementary." Scanlon said during pre-production that, "Pete Docter, the original director, and John Lasseter ... finally said to me, 'it's great that you're honoring that, but you have to do what's right for the story.' So we made a tough decision to just have them be in college and put that line aside." Scanlon joked that the line from the first film was "an old monster expression", saying, "That’s what monsters always say to each other."

Animation 
Monsters University is the first Pixar film that used global illumination, a new lighting system introduced as part of the overhaul of the rendering system used since the first Toy Story film. In the planning stage of the film, director of photography, Jean-Claude Kalache, asked "What if we made these lights just work?" Before the new system, artists had to build reflections and shadows manually, which became increasingly complex as the models and the setups became more technologically advanced. The new lighting system uses path tracing, a technique that imitates the behavior of the light in the real world; this automatized the process, delivered more realism, produced soft shadows, and let the artist spend more time on models and complex scenes – some of which contained thousands of light sources.

For research, the filmmakers visited several colleges in the U.S., including Harvard University, Stanford University, UC Berkeley, and the Massachusetts Institute of Technology, observing college architecture, student life, Greek organizations, and the teaching methods of professors and faculty. To research fraternity life, which is central to the film, many of the film's producers spent several weeks at a fraternity house. Researchers also attended a "Bonfire Rally" at Berkeley in anticipation of the Big Game, a rivalry football game between the university and Stanford.

Music

The music for the film is Randy Newman's seventh collaboration with Pixar as composer. Walt Disney Records released the soundtrack on June 18, 2013.

The songs "Main Title", "Rise and Shine", and "The Scare Games" feature the drum line from the Blue Devils group "BD Entertainment". The recordings for the percussion tracks were done at Skywalker Ranch, and were written by Blue Devils Percussion Caption Head Scott Johnson.

The songs "Ísland" by Mastodon and "Gospel" by MarchFourth Marching Band are featured during the film but do not appear on the soundtrack. The songs "Party Hard" by Andrew W.K. and "Kickstart My Heart" by Mötley Crüe are featured prominently in the teaser trailers but do not appear on the soundtrack or in the film.

 Track listing

Release

Theatrical
The film had its worldwide premiere on June 5, 2013, as a special screening at BFI Southbank in London with the director and producer in attendance. The film had its Asian premiere as the opening film of the 2013 Shanghai International Film Festival on June 15, 2013. It premiered in the United States on June 8, 2013, at the Seattle International Film Festival, and was released in theaters on June 21, 2013. The film's theatrical release was accompanied by Pixar's short film titled The Blue Umbrella.

Marketing
Four versions of the trailer exist; in his sleep, Mike mutters excuses to avoid attending class in each one, such as "I'm not wearing any clothes," "My homework ate my dog," "Class President?", and "My pony made the Dean's List." A second trailer was released on February 11, 2013, a third on April 26, 2013, and a fourth and final trailer, which included scenes from the film, was released on May 30, 2013.

On October 8, 2012, Pixar revealed a fully functional website for Monsters University, complete with information about admissions, academic and campus life, and a campus store to purchase MU apparel. On April 1, 2013, the website was styled to appear as though a rival college, Fear Tech, had hacked and vandalized it. The first television commercial for the film was aired during the 2013 Rose Bowl Game, parodying advertisements for participating schools that are shown during college football telecasts. From June 27 until July 11, 2013, Disney's online game Club Penguin hosted a Monsters University Takeover event to promote the film. Players could dress up as their favorite monsters and take part in the Scare Games.

Home media
Monsters University was released by Walt Disney Studios Home Entertainment on Blu-ray, 3D Blu-ray, DVD, digital copy, and on demand on October 29, 2013. It was accompanied by The Blue Umbrella, Pixar's short film which played alongside the film in theaters. Monsters University was released on 4K Blu-ray on March 3, 2020.

Reception

Box office
Monsters University grossed $268.5 million in the United States and Canada and $475.1 million in other countries, for a worldwide total of $743.6 million. Calculating in all expenses, Deadline Hollywood estimated that the film made a profit of $179.8 million.

It became the 53rd highest-grossing film of all time, the 11th highest-grossing animated film all time, the seventh-highest-grossing 2013 film, and the third-highest-grossing Pixar film. The film earned $136.9 million worldwide on its opening weekend. Disney declined to provide a budget for the film; Entertainment Weekly speculated that it was higher than that of Brave ($185 million), mainly because of the high cost of John Goodman and Billy Crystal reprising their roles. Shockya and EOnline reported the budget to be $200 million—on par with previous Pixar films.

North America
In the week leading to Monsters Universitys release, Disney projected an opening-weekend gross of at least $70 million. The film opened on Friday, June 21, 2013 across 4,004 theaters in first place with $30.47 million—including $2.6 million in 20:00 Thursday night shows—marking the fifth-largest opening day among animated films. The film then reached first place with an opening-weekend gross of $82.43 million; the second-largest among Pixar films, the second-largest among G-rated films, the fourth-largest among prequels, the fifth-largest among animated films, and the fifth-largest among films released in June. Monsters University remained at first place on its second weekend, declining 45% to $45.6 million. Facing tough competition from Despicable Me 2 on its third weekend, it dropped 57% to $19.7 million. As of December 2013, it is the tenth-highest-grossing animated film.

Outside North America
The film earned $54.5 million in 35 markets on its opening weekend. It set a Pixar opening-weekend record in Latin America with revenues of $31.7 million. In Argentina, the film set an opening-weekend record among all films with $5.49 million. In Australia, where it had a simultaneous release with Despicable Me 2, Monsters University debuted behind the latter with $3.56 million in third place. In Hong Kong, the film set opening-day, single-day and opening-weekend records among animated films, beating the previous record holder, Toy Story 3. The film's largest opening occurred in China, where its $13 million debut ranked fourth among Disney films. The film's highest-grossing markets are Japan ($90.1 million), the UK, Ireland, and Malta ($47.2 million), and Mexico ($37.6 million).

Critical response
The site's critical consensus reads "Offering Monsters, Inc. fans a welcome return visit with beloved characters, Monsters University delivers funny and thoughtful family entertainment for viewers of any age." Another review aggregator, Metacritic, which assigns a rating out of 100 top reviews from mainstream critics, calculated a score of 65 based on 41 reviews, indicating "generally favorable reviews". Audiences polled by CinemaScore gave the film an average grade of "A" on an A+ to F scale. According to Disney, audiences were 56% female and 60% below the age of 25. Families made up 73% of business, and teens accounted for 15%. The film played well with all ages.

Matt Zoller Seitz of Chicago Sun-Times gave the film four stars out of four, saying it "is true to the spirit of [Monsters, Inc.] and matches its tone. But it never seems content to turn over old ground." Trevor Johnston of Time Out gave the film four stars out of five, writing "It has enough of the right stuff to haunt the imagination long after the immediate buzz of its fluffy-furred cuteness has melted away. For a mere prequel, that's a result." Steven Rea of The Philadelphia Inquirer gave the film three stars out of four and said it "is cute, and funny, and the animation, though not exactly inspired, is certainly colorful." Jake Coyle of Associated Press gave the film three stars out of four, saying it "might not be as gifted as some of its other movies, but sometimes it's alright to be OK." Peter Travers of Rolling Stone gave the film three stars out of four, and said "It's all infectious fun, despite the lack of originality. In the art of tickling funny bones, Crystal and Goodman earn straight A's." Richard Corliss of Time gave the film a positive review, saying "This minor film with major charms still deserves to have kids dragging their parents to the multiplex for one more peek at the monsters in the closet. With Pixar, familiarity breeds content." Bill Goodykoontz of The Arizona Republic gave the film three-and-a-half stars out of five and said it is "one of those movies that has absolutely no reason to exist, but once you've seen it, you're kind of glad it does." Alan Scherstuhl of The Village Voice gave the film a positive review, saying "Monsters University feels not like the work of artists eager to express something but like that of likable pros whose existence depends on getting a rise out the kids. It's like the scares Sully and Mike spring on those sleeping tykes: technically impressive but a job un-anchored to anything more meaningful."

Leonard Maltin of IndieWire praised the animation and art direction, but wrote that he wished "the movie was funnier and wasn't so plot-heavy" and that "Pixar has raised the bar for animated features so high that when they turn out a film that's merely good, instead of great, they have only themselves to blame for causing critics to damn them with faint praise." Michael Phillips of Chicago Tribune gave the film two stars out of four, saying "Monsters University, the weirdly charmless sequel to the animated 2001 Pixar hit Monsters, Inc., is no better or worse than the average (and I mean average) time-filling sequel cranked out by other animation houses." Todd McCarthy of The Hollywood Reporter gave the film a negative review, saying that it "never surprises, goes off in unexpected directions or throws you for a loop in the manner of the best Pixar stories. Nor does it come close to elating through the sheer imagination of its conceits and storytelling." Claudia Puig of USA Today gave the film three stars out of four, and said it "may not be as inventive as Inc., but it's an amusing and amiable addition to Pixar's roster of animated coming-of-age stories." Michael O'Sullivan of The Washington Post gave the film three stars out of four, saying "It may be children's terror that powers the movie's fictional universe, but it's the energy of its stars that lights up Monsters University." Chris Nashawaty of Entertainment Weekly gave the film an A− and said it "is exactly the rebound Pixar needed after 2011's Cars 2 left some wondering if the studio had lost its magic. The delightful story of when Mike met Sulley puts those concerns to rest." James Berardinelli of ReelViews gave the film three stars out of four and wrote "Although it falls short of the best Pixar has brought to the screen over its long association with Disney, it's nevertheless worth a trip to the theater, especially for kids."

However, the film was not without its detractors. Richard Roeper gave the film a C+, saying "This is a safe, predictable, edge-free, nearly bland effort from a studio that rarely hedges its bets." Stephen Whitty of Newark Star-Ledger gave the film two-and-a-half stars out of four and said "The artwork is accomplished, and intricate. The G-rating is genuine, without any gross-out gags. And there's none of the usual winks to the adults with tired, pop-culture references." Manohla Dargis of The New York Times gave the film two-and-a-half stars out of five and wrote "Both the originality and stirring emotional complexity of Monsters, Inc., with its exquisitely painful and touching parallels with the human world, are missing." Ty Burr of The Boston Globe gave the film two-and-a-half stars out of four, and said "This is not a bad movie, and to small children it will be a very good one, but it's closer to average than one would wish from the company that gave us Up, WALL-E, The Incredibles, and the Toy Story series." Rene Rodriguez of Miami Herald gave the film two stars out of five and wrote that it "feels half-hearted and lazy, like they weren't even trying. At least show a little effort, guys."

Accolades
Monsters University marks the first Pixar film not to be nominated for either an Oscar or a Golden Globe.

Notes

References

External links

 
 
 
 
 
 Official University website

2013 films
2010s English-language films
2013 3D films
2013 computer-animated films
2010s American animated films
2010s monster movies
American children's animated fantasy films
American computer-animated films
American monster movies
Animated films about friendship
Annie Award winners
Films about fraternities and sororities
Films directed by Dan Scanlon
Films scored by Randy Newman
Films set in universities and colleges
Films with screenplays by Dan Scanlon
Fictional universities and colleges
Monsters, Inc.
Pixar animated films
Prequel films
Walt Disney Pictures animated films
3D animated films
2013 directorial debut films
Films about Yeti
American prequel films